São Julião de Palácios e Deilão is a civil parish in the municipality of Bragança, Portugal. It was formed in 2013 by the merger of the former parishes São Julião de Palácios and Deilão. The population in 2011 was 400, in an area of 80.62 km2.

Climate

References

Parishes of Bragança, Portugal